Nizhnedevitsk is a rural locality (a selo) and the administrative center of Nizhnedevitsky District of Voronezh Oblast, Russia. Population:

History
Nizhnedevitsk was founded in late 17th century by settlers from Zemlyansk and Stary Oskol. In 1779 it was granted town rights and became seat of Nizhnedevitsky Uyezd. Under the new division, administrative buildings from the abolished town of Kostensk were relocated there. The proximity of such large cities as Voronezh and Stary Oskol did not allow Nizhnedevitsk to develop into a commercial or industrial center. In 1928, after the uyezd was abolished, Nizhnedevitsk lost its town status and became a selo, or village.

There is an eponymous settlement 19 km to the north, which emerged around Nizhnedevitsk railway station.

References

Notes

Sources

Rural localities in Nizhnedevitsky District
Nizhnedevitsky Uyezd